River Forest Community School Corporation is a school district headquartered in New Chicago, Indiana. The district serves New Chicago, portions of Lake Station, portions of Hobart, unincorporated sections of Lake County, and portions of Gary.

In 2015, River Forest advocated for in the community to pass a referendum of $0.42 on assessed value to help the school district. In 2019, the school district is now asking for $1.19 on assessed value to take advantage of re-claiming money lost to the 2020 circuit breaker in Lake County, Indiana.

Compliance problems
Per SBOA report #B49917, monies have been mismanaged by River Forest resulting in understatements, and accounts being overdrawn.

Schools

Secondary schools
 River Forest High School (Lake Station)
 River Forest Middle School (Lake Station)

Elementary schools
 Henry S. Evans Elementary School (Lake Station)
 John I. Meister Elementary School (Unincorporated area)

References

External links
 River Forest Community School Corporation
 

Education in Lake County, Indiana
School districts in Indiana
Education in Gary, Indiana
1954 establishments in Indiana